I Done a Album is the first album by British beat-box artist Beardyman. The album features a number of satirical tracks, often direct parodies of the likes of Aphex Twin or Dizzee Rascal.

Track listing

References

2011 debut albums